The String Quartet No. 3 in E minor, Op. 30, by Pyotr Ilyich Tchaikovsky, was composed in 1876, and is the last of his three string quartets. It was written as a memorial for Ferdinand Laub. (The date upon the manuscript is early February 1876.)

The quartet was performed for the first time at a party at Nikolai Rubinstein's apartment on March 2, 1876.  The first public performance was at a concert on 30 March (new style/March 18 (old style), the performers being: Jan Hřímalý and Adolph Brodsky, violins; Yuly Gerber, viola; and Wilhelm Fitzenhagen, cello.

Once, while Tchaikovsky was staying with some friends, they surprised him by bringing in a string quartet who performed this quartet for him. When they finished playing, Tchaikovsky remarked, "At first I didn't much like the Finale, but now I see that it is quite good."

Recently, it was featured in the downloadable content Left Behind for the 2013 video game The Last of Us.

Structure 
The work is in four movements and is approximately 37 minutes long.

The Andante funebre was originally intended to be the second movement, with the Allegretto vivo e scherzando as the third, but Tchaikovsky later decided to switch them.

References

External links
 
 Tchaikovsky Research

String Quartet No. 3
Compositions in E-flat minor
1876 compositions